Bence Horváth (born 1 August 1992) is a Hungarian sprint canoeist.

In 2017, Horváth won silver medals in the K-1 200 metre event at both the World and European championships. However, it was subsequently revealed he tested positive for EPO in an out-of-competition test on 12 June that year; as a result, he was stripped of both medals and served a four-year ban backdated to said test.

References

Living people
1992 births
Hungarian male canoeists
People from Tata, Hungary
Sportspeople from Komárom-Esztergom County
21st-century Hungarian people